Dennis Demmers (21 March 1975) is a Dutch football coach and former footballer. He is best known as a coach in amateur football. In 2010, when coaching both Excelsior '31 (Saturday) and Colmschate '33 (Sunday) he received the Rinus Michels Award. 

In professional soccer, he was an assistant manager, scout and manager (2015–2016) of Go Ahead Eagles. He went on to become assistant coach and video analyst of Al-Taawoun FC in Saudi Arabia. Head coach Darije Kalezić was fired after five games, as was Demmers.

Demmers was added to the Netherlands national team staff to analyse players and teams for the upcoming UEFA Euro 2020, alongside fellow coaches Cees Lok and Gert Aandewiel.

References

1975 births
Living people
Dutch expatriate sportspeople in Saudi Arabia
Sportspeople from Deventer
Dutch football managers
Rinus Michels Award winners
Go Ahead Eagles managers
Go Ahead Eagles non-playing staff
FC Twente non-playing staff
Association football coaches